K. T. Muhammed (29 September 1927 – 25 March 2008), popularly known as KT, was a Malayalam playwright and screenwriter. He had scripted about 40 stage plays, including Idhu Bhumiyanu (This is the Earth), considered to be his masterpiece. He had also written screenplay for about 20 films, including Kandam Becha Kottu, Thurakkatha Vathil, Moodupadam, and Kadalpalam. K. T. was a recipient of Sangeet Natak Akademi Award.

Biography

K. T. was born in Manjeri in Malappuram district as the eldest son of a policeman and had very little formal education. After schooling he worked as a clerk in the postal department.

In 1952, he got the first prize in an all India short story contest for his story Kannukal (Eyes) which was later translated into many foreign languages. He was an active member of Brothers Music Club of Kozhikode which was the training ground of many famous artists. He worked as the editor of Chithrakarthika weekly for a brief period of time. He started Sangamam Theatre a professional drama troupe which staged many of his famous plays both inside and outside the state. In 1971, he was nominated as the Chairman of Kerala Sangeetha Nataka Akademi and in 1974 as Chairman of Kerala State Film Development Corporation. 

He married actress Zeenath and that relation ended in divorce. The couple has a son Jithin. He died on 25 March 2008 at Pavangad, Kozhikode.

Selected Plays

Oorum Perum (A Person with Name and Dignity)
Avar Theerumanikkunnu (They are Deciding)
Karavatta Pashu (The Cow that Stopped Milking)
Manushyan Karagruhathil (Man in Prison)
Ithu Bhoomiyanu (This is the Earth)
Kaffar
Acchanum Bappayum
Naalkkavala (The Junction)
Njan Pedikkunnu (I am Getting Frightened)
Kainathikal
his one of the work is Baburaj.PendulamKalithokku (The Toy Gun)Operation TheatreSrishti (The Creation)SthithiSamharam (The Annihilation)Sakshatkaram (The Fulfillment)Samanwayam (The Union)Sanatanum (The Eternal)SannahamVellapokkam (The Flood)Deepasthambam Mahashcharyam" Soothradharan"

Awards

Kerala State Film Awards twice, for the Best Screenwriting; Kadalpalam, 1969 and Achanum Bappayum'', 1972
Kerala Sangeetha Nataka Akademi Fellowship, 1982
Sangeet Natak Akademi Award, 1986
 Bahrain Keraleeya Samajam "Sahithya Award", 2005

References

External links
K. T. at Calicutcity.com

Indian Muslims
Screenwriters from Kerala
Malayali people
Malayalam-language writers
Malayalam-language dramatists and playwrights
1927 births
2008 deaths
People from Malappuram district
Kerala State Film Award winners
Malayalam screenwriters
Indian male dramatists and playwrights
20th-century Indian dramatists and playwrights
Manjeri
20th-century Indian male writers
20th-century Indian screenwriters
Recipients of the Sangeet Natak Akademi Award
Recipients of the Kerala Sangeetha Nataka Akademi Fellowship